Richardson Lake may refer to:

 Richardson Lake, Minnesota
 Richardson Lakes (Maine)
 Richardson Lakes, Antarctica